The men's 73 kg competition of the 2014 World Judo Championships was held on 27 August.

Medalists

Results

Finals

Repechage

Pool A
First round fights

Pool B
First round fights

Pool C
First round fights

Pool D
First round fights

Prize money
The sums listed bring the total prizes awarded to 14,000$ for the individual event.

References

External links
 
 Draw

M73
World Judo Championships Men's Lightweight